Adenta East is a town in Adenta District in the Greater Accra Region of southeastern Ghana, and north of Madina. Adenta East is the thirty-ninth most populous settlement in Ghana, in terms of population, with a population of 44,194 people. At the Ghana census of 26 March 2000, the population was 31,070 inhabitants living in the town. Projections of 1 January 2007 estimated a population of 39,730 inhabitants.

See also 
 Railway stations in Ghana

References 

Populated places in the Greater Accra Region